An aludel (  from Greek  , 'smoky, sooty, burnt-colored') is a subliming  pot used in alchemy. The term refers to a range of earthen tubes, or pots without bottoms, fitted one over another, and diminishing as they advance towards the top. The lowest is adapted to a pot, placed in a furnace, wherein the matter to be sublimed is placed.  At the top is a head to retain the flowers, or condensation, which ascends.  An aludel was used as a condenser in the sublimation process and thus came to signify the end-stages of transformation and the symbol of creation.  Also called the Hermetic Vase, the Philosopher's Egg, and the Vase of the Philosophy.

Description 

The contrivance serves to sublimate mercury (zaybak), sulfur, orpiment (zarnīkh) and the like. It is made of glass or clay (fakhkhār) and consists of two tubes (ziḳḳ, actually hoses) fitted together. The mineral is put in the lower tube, the two tubes are fitted together with clay and the whole is put on the fire. The ascending smoke gets to the upper tube, cools down and produces the desired sublimate.

The aludel is illustrated in a Pseudo-Geber treatise, in the Bibliotheca Chemica Curiosa of Jean-Jacques Manget, and in a Syriac alchemy manuscript conserved in the British Museum. It is mentioned in the "Mafātīḥ al-ʿUlūm" ("Key of Sciences") of Khwārazmī.

See also 
 Alembic

References 

Alchemical tools
Chemical processes
Containers